Shiver is a 2012 American thriller film directed by Julian Richards, based on the 1992 novel of the same name by Brian Harper. The film stars Danielle Harris, John Jarratt and Casper Van Dien.

Plot
Wendy Alden (Danielle Harris), a young secretary in Portland lacking in self- confidence becomes victim of a savage killer Franklin Rood (John Jarratt) who has claimed the lives of a number of other women. Somehow Wendy finds the resources of courage to fight back and escape.

Cast 
 Danielle Harris - Wendy Alden
 John Jarratt - Franklin Rood
 Casper Van Dien - Detective Delgado
 Rae Dawn Chong - Detective Burdine
 Brad Harris - The Captain
 Valerie Harper - Audrey Alden

Production
The film was shot on location in Portland, Oregon.

Release
The film screened at the Sitges Film Festival on October 5, 2012.

References

External links 

2012 thriller films
2012 films
Films set in Portland, Oregon
Films shot in Portland, Oregon
Films scored by Richard Band
American thriller films
2010s English-language films
2010s American films